Matthew Robert Killilea (November 7, 1862 - July 27, 1902) was an American lawyer and politician.

Born in Poygan, Wisconsin, Killilea went to the Daggett Business College in Oshkosh, Wisconsin and then graduated from the University of Wisconsin Law School. He practiced law in Milwaukee, Wisconsin and was appointed assistant district attorney of Milwaukee County, Wisconsin. Killilea served in the Wisconsin State Assembly in 1899 as a Democrat. He died in Poygan, Wisconsin. His brother was Henry Killilea.

Notes

External links
SABR Project Matthew Killilea

1862 births
1902 deaths
Politicians from Milwaukee
People from Winnebago County, Wisconsin
University of Wisconsin Law School alumni
Wisconsin lawyers
Lawyers from Milwaukee
19th-century American politicians
Democratic Party members of the Wisconsin State Assembly